Mahesh Priyadarshana (born 24 October 1981) is a Sri Lankan cricketer. He made his first-class debut for Sri Lanka Police Sports Club in the 2004–05 Premier Trophy on 8 October 2004. In April 2018, he was named in Dambulla's squad for the 2018 Super Provincial One Day Tournament.

References

External links
 

1981 births
Living people
Sri Lankan cricketers
Sri Lanka Police Sports Club cricketers
Place of birth missing (living people)